Ida Pauline Rolf (May 19, 1896 – March 19, 1979) was a biochemist and the creator of Structural Integration or "Rolfing", a pseudoscientific alternative medicine practice.

Early life
Rolf was born in New York City in the Bronx on May 19, 1896. She was an only child. Her father, Bernard Rolf, was a civil engineer who built docks and piers on the east coast.

Rolf graduated from Barnard College in 1916 with a bachelor's degree in chemistry. She was in the Mathematics Club, German Club, Vice President of the class of 1916, a member of the Young Women's Christian Assn., was the alternate for the Graduate Fellowship while working at the Rockefeller Foundation, Business Manager of The Barnard Bulletin, and a member of Phi Beta Kappa. She received Departmental Honours in Chemistry at graduation. In 1917 she began her doctoral studies at Columbia University and, concurrently, Rolf also began work at the Rockefeller Institute as a chemical researcher. 

In 1920, Rolf earned her PhD in biological chemistry under the supervision of Phoebus Aaron Theodore Levene, of the Columbia University College of Physicians and Surgeons. Her dissertation was entitled "Three Contributions to the Chemistry of the Unsaturated Phosphatides", originally printed in three separate issues of "The Journal of Biological Chemistry", it was again printed in its entirety as a bound book in late 1922,  "Phosphatides".

Throughout the decade, she studied yoga with Pierre Bernard, and yoga influenced her development of Rolfing.

Career
After graduating, Rolf continued to work with Levene at the Rockefeller Institute for Medical Research in New York City. In 1918, she was promoted to assistant in the chemistry lab.

In 1922, two years after having received her PhD from Columbia, Rolf was raised to associate, then the highest non-tenured position for a scientist at Rockefeller.

From 1919 to 1927, she published 16 scholarly journal papers, mostly in the Journal of Biological Chemistry. Her research was primarily laboratory studies on biochemical compounds lecithin and cephalin. With the exception of her doctoral dissertation, all of her published work was co-authored with Levene.

In 1926, Rolf left her academic work in New York, to study mathematics and atomic physics at the Swiss Federal Institute of Technology in Zurich and also biochemistry at the Pasteur Institute in Paris, 
France.

Rolf later developed Structural Integration. In addition to her 16 academic papers published from 1919 to 1927, she would later publish two papers in scholarly journals on Structural Integration. She had an h-index of 10 with a total number of 299 citations (February, 2007).

In the mid-1960s, she began teaching her Structural Integretion method at Esalen Institute. Esalen was the epicenter of the Human Potential Movement, allowing Rolf to exchange ideas with many contemporary visionaries, including Fritz Perls.

In 1971, Rolf´s teaching activities were consolidated under the Rolf Institute of Structural Integration (RISI). As of 2010, RISI had graduated 1536 practitioners, including some trained in Germany, Brazil, Japan, and Australia, in addition to the main program in Boulder, Colorado. In 1990, a group of senior faculty split off to found the Guild of Structural Integration, which had 628 graduates as of 2010. Currently there are about two dozen schools teaching Structural Integration. Standards for the field of Structural Integration are maintained by a professional membership organization, the International Association of Structural Integration.

In addition to the proliferation of programs that are devoted specifically to Structural Integration, Rolf's concepts and methods have influenced a wide range of other contemporary manual therapies. A growing number of organizations offer training in "structural bodywork" or in techniques of fascial manipulation that are clearly derivative but lack the holistic perspective of Structural Integration, instead focusing only on the treatment of specific symptoms (i.e. massage therapists, chiropractors or physical therapists).

Structural Integration (Rolfing)

Structural Integration (or Rolfing) is a type of manual therapy that claims to improve human biomechanical functioning as a whole rather than to treat particular symptoms. Rolf began developing her system in the 1940s. Her main goal was to organize the human bodily structure in relation to gravity. Rolf called her method "Structural Integration", now also commonly known by the trademark "Rolfing".

Structural integration is a pseudoscience and its claimed benefits are not substantiated by medical evidence.

Publications on structural integration
 1978 VERTICAL - Experiential Side to Human Potential, Journal of Humanistic Psychology
 1973 Structural Integration - Contribution to understanding of stress, Confinia Psychiatrica
 1979 Rolfing: Reestablishing the Natural Alignment and Structural Integration of the Human Body for Vitality and Well-Being, Healing Arts Press

Personal life
Rolf was married to Walter Frederick Demmerle, an electrical and mechanical engineer who held patents for heating thermostats, and traveled abroad frequently with his work. They resided in Stony Brook, New York, and Manhasset, New York, while raising a family. They had two sons, Alan Michael Demmerle and Richard Rolf Demmerle, a chiropractor and also a Rolfing instructor and practitioner.

Notes

References
Feitis, Rosemary. 1985. Rolfing and Physical Reality. Healing Arts Press

External links
Biography and photo gallery from the Rolf Research Foundation

1896 births
1979 deaths
American women biochemists
People in alternative medicine
American women chemists
Columbia University alumni
Barnard College alumni
20th-century American women scientists
20th-century American chemists
Somatic therapists